Unorganized North Algoma District is an unorganized area in northeastern Ontario, Canada, comprising all areas in Algoma District, north of the Sault Ste. Marie to Elliot Lake corridor, which are not part of an incorporated municipality or a First Nation. Many of these communities were/are stations on the Algoma Central Railway or were logging/mining towns.

Local services boards 
 Aweres (includes Heyden and Island Lake)
 Batchawana Bay
 Goulais and District (includes Bellevue, Bourdage Corner, Goulais Bay, Goulais River, Karalash Corners, Kirby's Corner and Sand Bay)
 Hawk Junction
 Missanabie
 Peace Tree
 Searchmont (includes Glendale, Northland and Wabos)
 Wharncliffe and Kynoch (includes Kynoch and Wharncliffe)

Communities

Agawa Bay 
Agawa Bay is located along Highway 17 at the southern boundary of Lake Superior Provincial Park. Agawa Bay is a popular tourist destination mainly due to its picturesque landscapes, beautiful fall colours, and because of its close proximity to the Agawa Canyon Tour Train, which runs from Downtown Sault Ste. Marie and makes its longest stop at the Agawa Canyon.

Amyot 
Amyot is located on the Canadian Pacific rail line, on the shores of Negwazu Lake, around 10 km east of Highway 17.

Anjigami 
Anjigami is located on the Canadian National rail line, nearby Anjigami Lake. The closest highway is ON-101, the highway is about 6.21 km at its closest to Anjigami. There is also a camp called Camp Anjigami that is located on the shores of Anjigami Lake.

Boon

Dalton 
Dalton is an abandoned village in the middle of Highway 651 about 27 km or 30 minutes from Missanabie. There is a small train station and some old buildings that serve as summer cottages. The railroad passes through the little town that has some trails to get to the nearby lakes such as Ogasiwi lake.

Dunns Valley 
Dunns Valley is located 30 km north of Bruce Mines at the end of Highway 670.

Fire River 
Fire River is an uninhabited railway siding located west of the Missinaibi River, between the Dishnish and Argolis stations. It can only be accessed by train as there are no roads leading to it. It is located about halfway between Hearst and Chapleau.

Franz 
Franz once had a booming economy in forestry, transportation and mining. The community's original name was Hobon. In 1914, the post office's name was changed to Franz, and the railway station was renamed from Hobon to Franz Station after former Algoma Steel executive William Charles Franz. The station closed in 1991 and the building was moved to Dubreuilville, where it serves as a library and tourist office. Today, Franz is little more than a forgotten ghost town, with many memories of the past either in complete disrepair or torn down.

Frater 
Marie.

Girdwood

Goudreau 
Goudreau was built as a stopping point along the Algoma Central Railway.

When the Cline mine opened, Goudreau sprang to life with some 200 residents coming to the area to work. Not all of the residents worked in the mine; some of them were prospectors in search of the gold, silver, copper and iron pyrite. During the First World War, the mine was leased to the Nichols Chemicals company for the production of sulphuric acid. After the war ended, the market fell and the mine ceased operations. Other mines soon set up operations in the area. They went by the names of The Emily, Algold, Algoma Summit and The Edward. Each mine had a town site for their employees.

The town continued to grow, with the building of a two-storey railway station, workers homes and a movie theatre. A post office was built in 1915 and closed in 1966.

The Second World War ultimately led to Goudreau's demise as the demand for gold came second to iron and steel for the war. The mines eventually closed down as costs increased. Located along Highway 519, Goudreau is now a virtual ghost town, still used for logging operations and summer homes.

Goulais Mission

Hale

Harmony Bay

Harmony Bay is a small community built around a beach on Lake Superior.

Havilland Bay 
Havilland Bay is a small unincorporated community built around a beach on Lake Superior.

Horsey

Island Lake 
Island Lake (46.6711° N 84.2687°W) is a rural settlement in the Unorganized North Part of Algoma District in northeastern Ontario, Canada. It is part of the Aweres local services board and is about 5 kilometres (3 mi) northeast of the community of Heyden, which sits on Ontario Highway 17, and is also 21.1 kilometers (13.1 mi) northeast of Sault Ste. Marie, the district seat. The settlement is at the junction of Ontario Highway 552 and Ontario Highway 556, and the Algoma Central Railway passes through the community. Island Lake was once home to Canadian Military installments—some buildings still remain in the area, however much have been either torn down or completely renovated. Island lake was also once the location of a train station—part of the Algoma Central and Hudson Bay Railway's Main Line.

To see the full—main article, click below.

Kennedy

Leeburn 

Leeburn is located along Highway 638. At one time there was a gold mine at Bass Lake, a few kilometres north of Leeburn.  The quality of the ore found was not sufficient to make the mine profitable.

Lochalsh 
Lochalsh is a ghost town and rail siding located at the very south end of Wabatongushi Lake, along the Canadian Pacific Railway between Missanabie and Franz. A taxi ran between Lochalsh, Goudreau, and the Cline Mine. When the mine closed in 1946, both towns became ghost towns. There are still active mining operations in the area as well as a few ghost mines.  The area around Lochalsh has a population of one.

MacDuff

Montreal River 
Montreal River or Montreal River Harbour is a very small community located at the mouth of the Montreal River just south of Lake Superior Provincial Park. Immediately north of the community, the Montreal River Hill is one of the more famous segments of Ontario Highway 17, simultaneously recognized for both its scenic vistas of the surrounding wilderness and its potential to create a bottleneck in the Trans-Canada Highway system because winter storms can render it impassable.

Northland Lake 
The community of Northland Lake is located near Highway 556 and found by following the Northland Lake Road that intersects it . The community is mostly a collection of summer cottages. The Algoma Central Railway also operated a train station in the community by the name of Northland Station.  The building still stands to this day but has been converted to a private cottage.

Norris

Oba 
Oba is located at the junction of the Canadian National and the Algoma Central Railways, approximately halfway between Dubreuilville and Hearst, and is a stop for Via Rail's Canadian. Oba is 100.92 km2 (38.97 mi2) and its population in 2021 was 5, a 66.7% decrease from 2016; 2 out of the 21 dwellings are occupied. The community is accessible by forest roads extending from Highway 583, by train, or by boat; the community is popular with fishers and hunters due to the abundance of forestry and streams or lakes in the area and is the location of a remote Ministry of Northern Development, Mines, Natural Resources, and Forestry office.

Ophir 
Ophir is a sparsely populated farming community located 25 km north of Bruce Mines. It is centered at the intersection of the east–west and north–south portions of Highway 638.

Non-native settlers began farming in the area around the time the mines of Bruce Mines closed in 1875. In November, 1889, William Moor, a farmer prospecting after the fall harvest, found ore containing gold atop a ridge overlooking what was then Lake Ickta (now Havilah Lake). After some ownership dispute, American investors organized the Ophir
Gold Mining Company (named after the biblical Ophir) to purchase the land in 1892. A small mining town was built, and gold mining operations commenced in 1893, producing 2489 tons of ore worth $8459. Operations ceased due to a financial panic in the United States and a fatal mining accident. The name of the mine and lake were changed to Havilah, another biblical reference, as mining resumed from 1910 to 1911, but the operation and its buildings were subsequently abandoned. Ophir and area are still home to abandoned mine shafts and buildings, however much are on private property and have not been maintained in decades—the area has also been referred to as 'Mcphee's Valley', an ode to a former family who settled in the community. Ophir has a volunteer fire department and area roads are patrolled by the OPP; major government services are delivered either 25 km south, via Highway 638, in Bruce Mines, or 59 km to the east via 638 & Highway 17, in Sault Ste. Marie.

Ophir was the birthplace of the late Dr. James McPhee, a veteran of World War II who was shot down from the sky in Germany, he was imprisoned in a German war camp near Auschwitz, and later escaped—he would ultimately help found the Mackenzie Richmond Hill Hospital, where he was chief of staff. McPhee would later serve as president of the Ontario College of Family Physicians in 1970–71, he closed his family practice in 1992 but worked as a surgical assistant until he was 84. McPhee passed away in 2019, at the age of 94, in Barrie, at the Royal Victoria Hospital.

Parkinson

Poplar Dale 
North of Ophir, this region was settled in the late 19th century for primarily agricultural reasons.  The community comprises all peoples living along the Thessalon River and its tributaries.  The community's major exports are beef and timber; Poplar Dale is home to the annual Northern Vibe Festival, a cannabis related festival consisting of music, art, and cannabis related festivities.

Ranger Lake 

The community of Ranger Lake is located along Highway 556 at the south end of the lake with the same name. It is mostly a collection of summer cottages and resorts. There is an old fire tower.

Ryerson

Swanson

Wabos 

Demographics 

N/A = Data not available

See also 
List of townships in Ontario

References

External links 

 Algoma Kinniwabi Travel Association

Geography of Algoma District
Algoma North
Populated places on Lake Superior in Canada